The British Rail Class 444 Desiro is an electric multiple-unit passenger train built by Siemens Transportation Systems in Austria between 2002 and 2004. The Class 444 currently operate on express passenger services for South Western Railway.

The class first entered service with South West Trains in 2004.

Description 

At the start of the 21st century, as part of its franchise agreement, South West Trains was required to replace the slam-door rolling stock of Classes 411, 412, 421 and 423, which did not meet modern health and safety standards, with new trains by 2005. In April 2001 an order was placed with Siemens for 785 vehicles. This was originally to be split as 100 four-car Class 450/0 outer-suburban units, 32 five-car Class 450/2 inner-suburban units, and 45 five-car Class 444 express units.

The Class 444 fleet was built at Siemens' Vienna plant. Before being shipped to Britain via the Channel Tunnel, the trains were extensively tested at Siemens' Wegberg-Wildenrath Test and Validation Centre in Germany. This was an attempt to reduce the time taken for new trains to enter service, by ironing out any problems beforehand. Many other designs of new train, such as the Alstom-built Class 458 units, had been plagued by problems and poor reliability. The Desiro fleet entered service faster than its competitors, but still suffered teething problems.

Each unit is formed of five cars; a driving motor car at each end and three intermediate trailers. One trailer in each unit is provided with two wheelchair spaces and a universally-accessible toilet.
The units have end-gangways, allowing passengers to move between units when used in multiple. Trains are limited to a ten-car length (i.e. two units), as longer trains cannot be accommodated in stations. At some stations with particularly short platforms (for example Shawford, in Hampshire), even a single unit of five cars is too long for the platform. Passengers used to have to board and alight via a single door opened by the guard, however, since the introduction of automatic selective door operation (ASDO) in early 2015, the computer system works out how many cars to release the doors on. The fleet is painted in a mixture of SWT's express livery of white, with a blue window band, and red/orange swishes at the cab ends (although they now have the South West Trains logo covered with a South Western Railway one) and the new South Western Railway livery being applied gradually across the entire SWR fleet.

Each five-car unit has a first-class section taking up just over half of one car at one end. All seats have BS 1363 230V mains sockets providing AC power for laptops or mobile phone chargers.

Like all new-build third-rail rolling stock in the UK, one car in each unit is fitted with a recess for a pantograph that allows for a future conversion to AC overhead power.

Both the Class 444 and 450 fleets are maintained at the purpose-built Northam Traincare Facility in Southampton, which is equipped to perform both preventative and corrective maintenance, deep-cleaning, and overhauls on up to eight units simultaneously.

A new variable-stiffness hydraulic bush has been fitted to the whole Class 444 fleet so as to reduce track damage and thus infrastructure maintenance costs. This work was completed by the end of 2013.

Awards 
Class 444 trains have been awarded the "Golden Spanner 2010" as Britain's most reliable trains by Modern Railways. During twelve months, SWT's fleet has set a new reliability record of almost 89,000 kilometres per technical delay.

Operations 

The first Class 444 units entered service with SWT in early 2004. As part of the launch, unit no. 444018 was named The Fab 444 at a ceremony at London Waterloo.

The units were introduced on services from London Waterloo to Portsmouth Harbour via the Portsmouth Direct Line. They were also used on some services on the South West Main Line to Southampton Central,  and on limited outer suburban services to Alton and Basingstoke. This allowed the withdrawal of the final 411 units by mid-2004, and inroads were made to the 421 and 423 fleets.

It was originally hoped that the final slam-door trains would be withdrawn by the end of 2004. In the event, some were allowed to remain operational until May 2005, as the last replacement Desiros came into service. Initially, the Class 444s were used mainly on Portsmouth direct services, allowing the Class 442 units to be used on the Weymouth line. The Class 444 units were also used regularly on Sunday-only Bournemouth stopping services, Waterloo to Southampton services and the Brockenhurst to Wareham shuttle service.

During 2007, the Class 444 units replaced the Class 442 on the Weymouth line. Some Class 442 workings were taken over by Class 444 units as early as November 2006; the final Class 442 was withdrawn in February 2007. Class 444 units transferred to the Weymouth line were replaced on Portsmouth services by Class 450 Desiros which became available after the reintroduction of the Class 458 units on the Waterloo to Reading line. The decision to transfer many Class 444 units to the Weymouth line was not popular. Portsmouth line passengers protested over the use of Class 450 on some services, while there were complaints that the Class 444 were inferior to the units they replaced on the Weymouth line.

Class 444s are currently used on the following services:

 Waterloo to Basingstoke (peak services)
 Waterloo to Portsmouth Harbour via Guildford (shared with )
 Waterloo to Portsmouth Harbour via Basingstoke and Fareham (shared with )
 Waterloo to Weymouth / Poole

Refresh 
South Western Railway has conducted a refurbishment programme under its contract from 2017 onwards. As part of this work, every unit has been deep cleaned, and the carpets and seat covers in standard class replaced. In addition, plug sockets have been provided at every pair of seats, and the buffet unit has been removed to provide extra seats. First class has been reduced from 35 seats to 32, and the 2+1 seating has been replaced with 2+2 seating, with leather seats and new tables providing facilities for wireless charging.

Fleet details

Interiors

Illustration

References

External links 

 Class 444 "Desiro" - South Western Railway

444
Siemens multiple units
Train-related introductions in 2004
750 V DC multiple units